WHSV may refer to:

 Weight Hourly Space velocity (chemistry)
 WHSV-TV, a television station (channel 20, virtual 3) licensed to serve Harrisonburg, Virginia, United States